Ted J. Opitz, CD (born August 25, 1961) is a former Canadian politician and a retired Canadian Forces Lieutenant-Colonel who represented the Toronto riding of Etobicoke Centre as a member of the Conservative Party of Canada in the House of Commons of Canada from 2011 to 2015.

Background
Opitz was born in the Parkdale area of Toronto in 1961 and is the youngest of four children. Opitz's parents were originally from Poland and immigrated to Canada shortly after World War II.

In 1978, Opitz enrolled as a private in the Canadian Army Reserves and rose to the rank of Lieutenant-Colonel during 33 years of service. In 1998 and early 1999, he served in Bosnia as a member of NATO's Stabilization Force (SFOR). During his military career, he performed various roles ranging from Assistant to the Chief of Staff at Canadian Forces College, a course instructor and military planner for Pope John Paul II and his World Youth Day visit to Canada in 2002. Prior to running and being elected to Parliament, Opitz was the Commanding Officer of The Lincoln and Welland Regiment.

During his military service, Opitz also had parallel careers in the Telecom industry, as well as completing a BA in English at York University. Starting as a technician, Opitz worked his way up to sales and marketing and managerial roles in product management and high speed internet development.

In June 2008 Opitz was one of three candidates for the Conservative nomination in Mississauga South, losing to financial consultant Hugh Arrison.

For the past two years, Opitz was the Senior Regional Advisor to Jason Kenney, Minister of Citizenship, Immigration and Multiculturalism. In that role, he represented the Government of Canada and the Minister in the Greater Toronto Area and Southern Ontario.

In Etobicoke, Opitz has been recognized for his volunteer work with the Polish community and youth in the region. Opitz has lived in Etobicoke Centre with his wife Cynthia since 1994 and was elected as the Member of Parliament in May 2011, serving until 2015.

Politics

Opitz was elected in 2011 federal election. He won by a margin of 26 votes over Liberal incumbent Borys Wrzesnewskyj in the initial count, triggering an automatic judicial recount. The recount confirmed his win but was later declared null and void on May 18, 2012 due to alleged irregularities in the voting registration process. However, Opitz appealed the decision to the Supreme Court of Canada, which reversed the lower court's ruling and upheld the original election result on October 25, 2012.

As a Member of Parliament, Opitz sat on the Standing Committee on Veterans Affairs and the Standing Committee on Procedure and House Affairs. In February 2012, Opitz was chosen as a delegate to represent the Parliament of Canada at both the Standing Committee of Parliamentarians of the Arctic Region and at the 56th Conference on the UN Commission on the Status of Women. He also is a vice-chairman of the Canada-Poland Parliamentary Friendship Association and chair of the Canada-Ukraine Parliamentary Friendship Group.

In 2013, Opitz acknowledged in an agreement with Elections Canada that his 2008 nomination donations violated the Canada Elections Act.

Opitz was one of thirteen Canadians banned from travelling to Russia under sanctions imposed by Russian President Vladimir Putin in March 2014. He replied via his official Twitter account, "Today's sanctions by Russia on myself and colleagues demonstrate Canada has been an effective voice in the world in support of Ukraine."

In the 2015 federal election, Opitz faced Wrzesnewskyj in a rematch of the 2011 contest and was defeated by 9,542 votes.

In the 2019 federal election, Optiz ran for election in his former riding and finished second to the Liberal candidate, Yvan Baker.

Electoral record

Honours and decorations
Opitz received the following honours and decorations during and after his military career.

 Canadian Government Volunteer Award and United Nations Volunteer Award
 Commanders Commendation for service to World Youth Days 2002
 Received Gold Cross for contributions to the Polish Combatants Association
 Canadian Forces Decoration with two bars for 32 years military service
 NATO Decoration for service in the former Yugoslavia
 Canadian Peacekeeping Service Medal
 Queen Elizabeth II Golden Jubilee Medal
 Queen Elizabeth II Diamond Jubilee Medal 
 Awarded Serving Brother of the Order of St. John
 Pro Memorial Medal (Poland)
 Knight's Cross Order of Merit (Poland)

References

External links

1961 births
Canadian people of Polish descent
Conservative Party of Canada MPs
Living people
Members of the House of Commons of Canada from Ontario
Military personnel from Toronto
People from Etobicoke
Politicians from Toronto
Canadian Army officers
York University alumni
Recipients of the NATO Meritorious Service Medal
Lincoln and Welland Regiment
21st-century Canadian politicians